Ellicott City Historic District is a national historic district in Ellicott City, Howard County, Maryland.  The Ellicott City Station is a National Historic Landmark located within the district.  The district encompasses a predominantly 19th century mill town whose origins date to 1772, including more than 200 18th- and 19th-century buildings. It was listed on the National Register of Historic Places in 1978.  The 2016 Maryland flood severely impacted the historic district on July 30, 2016, as did another flood on May 27, 2018.

It includes the Saint Paul Catholic Church, a church where Babe Ruth got married.

See also
List of Howard County properties in the Maryland Historical Trust
Patapsco Hotel

References

External links
 (apparently 325 pages, slow to load, not verified) Accompanying  (loads okay, verified March 14, 2018)
, including photo in 2003, at Maryland Historical Trust website
Boundary Map of the Ellicott City Historic District, Howard County, at Maryland Historical Trust
Photos of Ellicott City, Maryland on Wikimedia Commons
Photos of Main Street, Ellicott City on Wikimedia Commons

Buildings and structures in Ellicott City, Maryland
Historic districts in Howard County, Maryland
Historic districts on the National Register of Historic Places in Maryland
National Register of Historic Places in Howard County, Maryland